Blair ministry may refer to:

 First Blair ministry, the British majority government led by Tony Blair from 1997 to 2001
 Second Blair ministry, the British majority government led by Tony Blair from 2001 to 2005
 Third Blair ministry, the British majority government led by Tony Blair from 2005 to 2007

See also
 Premiership of Tony Blair
 Shadow Cabinet of Tony Blair